The Utah PGA Championship is a golf tournament that is the championship of the Utah section of the PGA of America. The Utah section was formed in 1986, and the tournament has been played annually since that time. Kim Thompson, a Utah club pro, holds the record for most wins with four. Bruce Summerhays and Bob Betley, both of whom have victories on the Champions Tour, have won this tournament.

Winners 

 2022 Mark Owen
 2021 Matt Baird
 2020 Joe Summerhays
 2019 Zach J. Johnson
 2018 Zach J. Johnson
 2017 Tommy Sharp
 2016 Tele Wightman
 2015 Matt Baird
 2014 Dustin Volk
 2013 Chris Moody
 2012 Mark Owen
 2011 Dustin Volk
 2010 Matt Baird
 2009 Ryan Rhees
 2008 Steve Schneiter
 2007 Mark Owen
 2006 Kury Reynolds
 2005 Kury Reynolds
 2004 Stephen Schneiter
 2003 James Blair
 2002 Henry White
 2001 Matt Johnson
 2000 Kim Thompson
 1999 Stephen Schneiter
 1998 Milan Swilor
 1997 Kim Thompson
 1996 Tom Costello
 1995 Kim Thompson
 1994 Kim Thompson
 1993 Stephen Schneiter
 1992 Milan Swilor
 1991 Bruce Summerhays
 1990 Milan Swilor
 1989 James Blair
 1988 Mike Malaska
 1987 Mike Malaska
 1986 Bob Betley

References

External links 
PGA of America – Utah section
Utah PGA Section Professional Championship/PNC: Past Champions

Golf in Utah
PGA of America sectional tournaments
Recurring sporting events established in 1986